The eleventh edition of the Caribbean Series (Serie del Caribe) was played in 1959. It was held from February 10 through February 15 with the champions teams from Cuba (Almendares), Panama (Coclé), Puerto Rico (Santurce) and Venezuela (Oriente). The format consisted of 12 games, each team facing the other teams twice. The games were played at UCV Stadium in Caracas, Venezuela, which boosted capacity to 35.000 seats, and the first pitch was thrown by Edgar Sanabria, by then the President of Venezuela.

Summary
Cuba won the Series with a 5-1 record for a fourth straight championship. The Almendares club won for the second time guided by manager Sungo Carrera and led by 1B Rocky Nelson (.320 BA, six RBI), LF Carlos Paula (.462), 2B Tony Taylor (.346, .462 SLG) and RF Sandy Amorós (.333). The pitching staff included starters Camilo Pascual (2-0, 16 strikeouts, 1.50 ERA, 18 innings), Orlando Peña (1-1, 17⅔ innings) Art Fowler (1-0, 1.00, nine innings) and reliever Mike Cuellar (1-0, 0.00). Other players for Cuba included pitchers Tommy Lasorda, Cholly Naranjo  and Carlos Pascual in addition to Bob Allison (OF), Jim Baxes (3B), Dick Brown (C), Miguel de la Hoz (2B), Enrique Izquierdo (C), Willy Miranda (SS), Leonardo Posada (OF) and Angel Scull (OF).
 
Venezuela, with a low-profile team, finished an honourable second place after going 4-2. Managed by Kerby Farrell, the offense was anchored by RF/1B and Series MVP Norman Cash, who finished with a .360 BA (9-for-25), 11 RBI and a .680 SLG. Oriente also received a considerable support from 3B Luis García and LF Jesús Mora, who tied for first place in the batting race with  a .417 average (10-for-24). García added six runs, three doubles and slugged .625, while Mora collected four runs and a .583 SLG. Werner Birrer was the top pitcher with a 2-0 record, including a 13-inning victory, a 1.25 ERA and 18 SO in 21⅔ innings. He also set a Series record with 13 innings pitched in a single game (#2), while Cash set a new mark with six RBI in a single game (#8). Other players included Elio Chacón (SS), Jim Owens (P), Ramón Monzant (P) and Jerry Snyder (2B).

Puerto Rico, managed by Ramón Concepción, disappointed with a 3-3 mark to finish in third place. C Valmy Thomas (.381) and 1B Orlando Cepeda (.333) led the attack, while Marion Fricano and Julio Navarro each pitched 1–0 shutouts. Santurce also featured Luis Arroyo (P), Joe Black (P), Jackie Brandt (CF), Orlando Cepeda (1B), Nino Escalera (1B/OF), Rubén Gómez (P), Willie Kirkland (RF), Bob Lennon (LF), Félix Maldonado (LF), Lloyd Merritt (P), José Pagán (3B), Victor Pellot Power (2B), José Santiago (P) and Pete Wojey (P).

Panama finished in last place with a 0-6 record, to become the first winless team in Series history. The Coclé club was managed by Lester Peden and benefited from a solid effort by RF Ken Hunt, who hit .304 with five RBI, home run, triple and a .609 SLG. Other players included P Bud Black, IF Owen Friend, SS Pumpsie Green, OF Gail Henley and IF/OF Joe Tuminelli, among others.

Scoreboards

Game 1, February 10

Game 2, February 10

Game 3, February 11

Game 4, February 11

Game 5, February 12

Game 6, February 12

Game 7, February 13

Game 8, February 13

Game 9, February 14

Game 10, February 14

Game 11, February 15

Game 12, February 15

See also
Ballplayers who have played in the Series

Sources
Antero Núñez, José. Series del Caribe. Jefferson, Caracas, Venezuela: Impresos Urbina, C.A., 1987.
Gutiérrez, Daniel. Enciclopedia del Béisbol en Venezuela – 1895-2006 . Caracas, Venezuela: Impresión Arte, C.A., 2007.

External links
Official site
Latino Baseball
Series del Caribe, Las (Spanish)
 

Caribbean
Caribbean Series
International baseball competitions hosted by Venezuela
Sport in Caracas
1959 in Caribbean sport
1959 in Venezuelan sport
Caribbean Series
20th century in Caracas